State Highway 21 (SH 21) is a State Highway in Kerala, India that starts in Chalakudy and ends at the state boundary at Malakkappara. The highway is 86.0 km long.

The Route Map 
Chalakudy (NH 544) - SH 21 Athirappilly Road - Vettilapara - Athirappilly Water Falls - Vazhachal - Peringalkuthu - Approach road to Sholayar Power House - Anamala - State boundary

See also 
 Roads in Kerala
 List of State Highways in Kerala

References 

State Highways in Kerala
Roads in Thrissur district